The Montana Historical Society (MHS) is a historical society located in the U.S. state of Montana that acts to preserve historical resources important to the understanding of Montana history. The society provides services through six operational programs: Administration, Research Center, Museum, Publications, Historic Preservation, and Education. It is governed by a 15-member Board of Trustees, appointed by the governor, which hires the director of the society and sets policy for the agency. Founded in 1865, it is one of the oldest such institutions in the Western United States.

History and organization
On December 21, 1864, seven months after the creation of the Montana Territory, Council Bill 15 was introduced into the Territorial legislature by Francis M. Thompson, a representative from Beaverhead County who would only live in Montana two and a half years, to create the Historical Society of Montana.  The bill, "An Act to Incorporate the Historical Society of Montana", was signed into law February 2, 1865 "in order to collect and arrange facts in regard to the early history of this Territory, the discovery of its mines, incidents of the fur trade, etc." and was incorporated by Hezekiah L. Hosmer, Christopher P. Higgins, John Owens, James Stuart, Wilbur F. Sanders, Malcolm Clark, Francis M. Thompson, William Graham, Granville Stuart, Walter W. deLacy, C.E. Irvine, and Charles S. Bagg. The society is the second oldest state historical society west of the Mississippi River. On March 25, 1865, members of the society elected Wilbur Sanders President, Granville Stuart Secretary-Treasurer, and the Honorable Hezekiah L. Hosmer Historian.  At the time of its founding, Granville Stuart was a merchant, Walter deLacy was the Territorial Surveyor, Hezekiah Hosmer was the Chief Justice of the Territorial Court and Wilbur Sanders was prominent in the Virginia City vigilante movement.

The Society was reorganized as a state agency March 4, 1891 and by "An Act to Perpetuate the Historical Society of the State of Montana" March 1, 1949.

Originally located in Virginia City, it was moved to Helena in 1874 after a disputed election approved Helena as the territory's new capital. In 1902, it was located in the basement of the new Montana State Capitol building.

Collections
 The archives collections include manuscripts from the early 1860s to the present, in addition to a large number of oral histories, mostly from the 20th and 21st centuries. The archives has served as the legal repository, or state archives, for Montana state and local government since 1969, and therefore includes a great number of government records. The photograph archives are extensive, housing over half-a-million images from the 19th and 20th centuries. The library collection comprises books and pamphlets, newspapers and periodicals, maps, federal and state publications, posters and musical scores, as well as the state's largest collection of newspaper clippings and magazine articles. The museum program has a substantial collection of art and artifacts documenting all of Montana history, including a large and representative group of materials documenting Montana Native American culture.

Publications
The first significant publications of the society were the Contributions to the Historical Society of Montana published in ten volumes between 1876 and 1941. Under the leadership of Society director K. Ross Toole, in 1951, the society began publication of the quarterly journal The Montana Magazine of History. In 1953, under the masthead "To Preserve, To Publish, and To Promote interest in, The History of Montana", the journal was renamed: Montana, The Magazine of Western History. The Society operates the Montana Historical Society Press to publish books for students and adults on subjects related to the people, places and events in Montana history.

Montana Historical Society Museum
The Montana Historical Society Museum, also known as Montana's Museum, is located in Helena, Montana. Open year-round, the museum's displays include the state's fine art, history, archaeological and ethnological artifacts. 
The Mackay Gallery of Russell Art features works by Western-artist Charles M. Russell in many media.  Other displays include Native Americans, settlers and home life, mining, frontier weapons and a white bison mount.

References

External links
 
 Historic Montana (MHS project)
 

1865 establishments in Montana Territory
Historical societies in Montana
History of Montana
Historical Society
State historical societies of the United States
State history organizations of the United States